The 1904 Latrobe Athletic Association season was their tenth season in existence. The team finished 9-0 and were unscored upon. Latrobe laid claim to Pennsylvania's pro football title at the season's end.

Schedule

Game notes

References

Latrobe Athletic Association
Latrobe Athletic Association seasons